WWE 24/7 may refer to:

WWE Classics on Demand, formerly known as WWE 24/7 On Demand and WWE 24/7 Classics
WWE 24/7 Championship